is a 2016 Japanese fantasy drama film written and directed by Hideto Sonoda. It was released in Japan by Nikkatsu on March 19, 2016.

Plot

Cast

Noboru Kaneko
Kazuki Shimizu
Miki Aika

Reception

References

External links
 

2010s Japanese films
2010s fantasy drama films
Japanese fantasy drama films
Nikkatsu films
2016 drama films